Charlotte Hall is a census-designated place (CDP) in Charles and St. Mary's counties, Maryland, United States. The population was 1,420 at the 2010 census. The Maryland Veterans Home for disabled veterans, including a U.S. Veterans Affairs clinic, is located on the site of the former Charlotte Hall Military Academy. The Academy site was declared the Charlotte Hall Historic District, and listed on the National Register of Historic Places in 1975. Since 1940, a sizable Amish farming community has existed nearby, along with a farmers' market and large flea market complex on Maryland Route 5, which is also the site of numerous strip-mall businesses continuing into the adjacent community of Mechanicsville.

Geography
Charlotte Hall is located at  (38.477210, −76.776323).

Demographics

As of the census of 2000, there were 1,214 people, 317 households, and 239 families residing in the CDP. The racial makeup of the CDP was 76.03% White, 20.18% African American, 0.91% Native American, 0.08% Asian, 0.08% Pacific Islander, and 2.72% from two or more races. Hispanic or Latino of any race were 0.58% of the population.

There were 317 households, out of which 30.9% had children under the age of 18 living with them, 55.8% were married couples living together, 15.1% had a female householder with no husband present, and 24.3% were non-families. 15.8% of all households were made up of individuals, and 6.9% had someone living alone who was 65 years of age or older. The average household size was 2.82 and the average family size was 3.15.

In the CDP, the population was spread out, with 18.1% under the age of 18, 5.5% from 18 to 24, 21.1% from 25 to 44, 22.1% from 45 to 64, and 33.2% who were 65 years of age or older. The median age was 50 years. For every 100 females, there were 150.8 males. For every 100 females age 18 and over, there were 170.1 males.

The median income for a household in the CDP was $51,111, and the median income for a family was $49,167. Males had a median income of $33,056 versus $21,071 for females. The per capita income for the CDP was $17,882. About 14.5% of families and 19.2% of the population were below the poverty line, including 33.0% of those under age 18 and 5.6% of those age 65 or over.

Notable people
 William Saunders Crowdy, the African-American theologian, was born as a slave here in 1847

References

Amish in Maryland
Census-designated places in St. Mary's County, Maryland
Census-designated places in Maryland